Ma'anshan Park station is a station on Line 9 of the Guangzhou Metro. Operations began on 28 December 2017.

Station layout

Exits

References

Railway stations in China opened in 2017
Guangzhou Metro stations in Huadu District